The Roman Catholic Diocese of Roseau is a diocese of the Latin Church of the Roman Catholic Church in the Caribbean. The diocese encompasses the entirety of the country of Dominica. The diocese is a suffragan of the Archdiocese of Castries, and a member of the Antilles Episcopal Conference. 

The diocese of Roseau was erected in 1850. The territory was previously part of the former Vicariate Apostolic of Trinidad.

Bishops

Ordinaries
Michael Monaghan (1851–1855)
Désiré-Michel Vesque (1856–1858)
René-Marie-Charles Poirier, C.I.M. (1858–1878)
Michael Naughten (1879–1900)
Philip Schelfhaut, C.Ss.R. (1902–1921)
Giacomo Moris, C.Ss.R. (1922–1957)
Arnold Boghaert, C.Ss.R. (1957–1993)
Edward Joseph Gilbert, C.Ss.R. (1994–2001), appointed Archbishop of Port of Spain, Trinidad and Tobago
Gabriel Malzaire (2002–2022)

Coadjutor bishops
Antoon Demets, C.SS.R. (1946–1954), did not succeed to see
Arnold Boghaert, C.SS.R. (1956–1957)

References

Catholic Church in Dominica
Roman Catholic dioceses in the Caribbean
Roseau
Roseau
 
1850 establishments in Dominica
Roman Catholic Ecclesiastical Province of Castries